Yap State ( or), is one of the four states of the Federated States of Micronesia (FSM). The other states are Kosrae State, Pohnpei State, and Chuuk State.

Historically, a tributary system existed between the Neighboring Islands and the Yap Main Islands. This is probably related to the need for goods from the high islands, including food and wood, to construct seagoing vessels.

According to the FSM Statistics Office, the population of Colonia and the municipalities of the State of Yap was 11,577 in 2020.

History
The islands are thought to have been populated from the Malay Archipelago. In approximately 950 AD, it was the seat of the Yapese Empire, contemporary to the Tu'i Tonga Empire. The outer islands, now part of the Yap state, were settled from Polynesia.

The island nation formerly used stone disks as currency. Since this stone money had to be made from a rock that could not be extracted on the island, its value derived from the dangers taken on expeditions to obtain it, mainly from Palau.

The Portuguese were the first Westerners to visit the island in 1525 when the navigator Diego Da Rocha arrived in Ulithi and stayed there for four months.

The Caroline Islands were under Spanish rule from the 16th century until the end of the 19th century. Still, most of the communities on the islands of the present state of Yap had little contact with Europeans and lived in complete independence. In 1885, following a conflict between Spain and Germany, the arbitration of Pope Leo XIII confirmed possession to Spain against commercial advantages for Germany. On June 30, 1899, after the Spanish–American War, Spain sold the Carolines, the Palau Islands, and the majority of the Marianas to the German Empire. At the start of the First World War, in 1914, the Empire of Japan occupied the area. This occupation was formally recognized within the framework of the Mandate of the Pacific Islands created in 1919 by the League of Nations.

The Caroline Islands came under the control of the United States in 1944, which administered them as a Trust Territory of the Pacific Islands under a UN mandate received in 1947. On May 10, 1979, Yap ratified the Constitution of the Federated States of Micronesia and became an integral part of this new nation with official independence on November 3, 1986. The state was once the Yap District of the Trust Territory of the Pacific Islands.

Geography

The State of Yap is the westernmost state of the Micronesian Federation. Further eastwards in order are the states of Chuuk, Pohnpei, and Kosrae. It consists of the four main islands of Rumung, Maap, Gagil-Tamil, and Yap Proper (Marbaa') and 134 smaller islands southwest and east of Yap.

Languages
The State of Yap has five official languages: English, Ulithian, Woleaian, Satawalese and Yapese.

Demographics
According to the FSM Statistics Division, the 2020 population of Yap State is 11,577. The state has the third-largest population among the states in the FSM, with Chuuk and Pohnpei leading in this order. The population of the state consists mainly of the local Yapese, Ulithians, Woleaians and Satawalese people; however, the state has been seeing a rise in the number of foreign citizens from countries such as the United States, Japan, Palau and the Philippines.

Religion
According to the 2018 International Religious Freedom Report compiled by the United States Department of State, an estimated 80% of the state population is Catholic, and the remainder is Protestant. Religious affiliation tends to follow clan lines. A majority of foreign citizens in the FSM and the state is made up of Filipino Catholics.

Municipalities

The State of Yap is divided into 21 municipalities, with each municipality having several village units incorporated through customs and historically set boundary lines. Each municipality can be placed in one of five main island groupings: Rumung, Maap, Gagil-Tamil, Marbaa' and the Neighboring Islands. The first four groupings are part of Yap Proper.

These municipalities are listed with their populations at the 2010 Census:

Not included: Pikelot.

Politics and government
The State of Yap is one of the four federal states of the Federated States of Micronesia. As a democratic federation, each state can retain a large number of power within the state as well as a certain level of sovereignty typical of federal states. As such, the State adheres to the FSM National and Yap State constitutions to develop policies and regulations.

The State Government is unique because it consists of four government branches, each serving a specific function for policymaking. The Executive Branch consists of the Governor as well as the Lieutenant Governor, along with the members of the government departments affiliated with the branch. The Executive Branch is responsible for executing laws and administering government services. The Yap State Legislature makes up the Legislative Branch, responsible for creating, debating, and passing bills for the Executive Branch to approve into law and enforce. The Yap State Court makes up the Judicial Branch, responsible for ensuring laws passed do not violate the state and national constitutions. The unique traditional branch vests its power into two groups of Yapese chiefs. The group of Yap Main Island chiefs is known as the Council of Pilung, and the group of Yapese outer island chiefs is known as the Council of Tamol. The two councils make sure whether proposed bills do not violate local traditional customs and regulate cultural issues.

Information about some state government leaders and administrative staff is included below.

Climate

Economy

The GDP per capita in 2018 was US$4,510, while the total GDP in 2018 was US$52 million. According to the 2010 Labor Market Statistics data compiled by the FSM Statistics Office, 67% of the total state population is in the labor force, the highest percentage of people in the labor force in the entire nation. Most of those in the labor force are in formal work, while the rest are in home production, including subsistence.

Yap has a relatively small tourism industry, with the Yap Visitors Bureau reporting only 4,000 annual visitors from 2010 to 2017. China's Exhibition & Travel Group has announced plans to develop a 4,000-unit resort on the island. Businesses that contribute to the state's tourism share of state GDP are Manta Ray Resort and Spa, ESA, and Yap Pacific Dive Resort.

The largest retail businesses in the State are Yap Cooperative Association (YCA) General Store, Guang Mao Enterprises, and EMI Enterprises. These businesses contribute primarily to the State's retail and wholesale sectors.

The State also has a small but essential financial sector that supports the population's investment and capital needs, local small- and medium-enterprises (SMEs), the government and state institutions, and the academic sector. It has five financial services institutions: the Bank of Guam (BOG), the Bank of the Federated States of Micronesia (BFSM), Community Ayuw Services Credit Union, Western Union, and the FSM Development Bank.

The State is now expected to be one of the fastest-growing economies in the country as technological innovation is highly encouraged. Although the FSM communications industry is largely monopolized by the state-operated FSM Telecommunications Corporation based in Pohnpei, Yap saw the rise of the tech startup company iBoom when the company is expected to utilise the National Government's Digital FSM Project 2017 grant funding from the World Bank to connect each home, work office, etc. iBoom is expected to challenge previous monopoly of the FSM Telecom Corporation through competitive pricing and services.

Transportation

Yap International Airport receives service from United Airlines as well as Pacific Mission Aviation. The state also has a small dockyard, colloquially known as Gampek, in Colonia just south of Tamil Harbor that services maritime vessels for inter-state and cross-border transport and freight.

Education
Post-secondary institutions:

College of Micronesia-FSM Yap Campus in Rull
FSM Fisheries and Maritime Institute in Gagil

State secondary schools:
Yap High School in Colonia
Woleai High School in Woleai
Outer Islands High School in Ulithi

Private Secondary and Elementary Schools:
Yap Catholic High School in Lamer village, Rull
Saint Mary's School in Colonia
Yap Seventh Day Adventist School in Tamil
Faith Christian Academy in Makiy, Gagil
Yap International Christian School in Gaanelay, Rull

Notable people
John Mangefel: FSM Founding Father; First State Governor
Petrus Tun: FSM Founding Father; first FSM Vice President; Second State Governor
Jennifer Chieng: Boxer and mixed martial artist (MMA)
Larry Raigetal: Master navigator
Lubuw Falanruw: Founder of tech startup iBoom; technology entrepreneur
Bartola Garrido: Chamorrita interpreter during the Spanish colonial period
Anna Falgog: founder Yap Women's Association

See also
Federated States of Micronesia
Habele, a South Carolina–based charitable organization providing private economic educational assistance in Yap
History of the Federated States of Micronesia.

References

External links

The Official Government Website for the Island of Yap
Federated States of Micronesia – Yap, Chuuk, Pohnpei, Kosrae
BBC
Statistics on buildings, population; Source: Statistics Section, Office of Planning and Budget, Yap State
United States of America and Japan – Treaty concerning the Yap Island and the other islands under mandate, situated in the Pacific North of the Equator and exchange of Notes relating thereto. Washington, 11 February 1922
NOAA's National Weather Service – Yap, FSM

States of the Federated States of Micronesia
Former empires
Island countries